The cheese fly (Piophila casei) is a species of fly whose larvae are known for infesting human foodstuffs including cured meats, smoked or salted fish, cheeses and also carrion. The larvae of this fly are known as cheese skippers, bacon skippers, ham skippers, etc. due to their ability to launch themselves several inches into the air when alarmed or disturbed. In the Mediterranean island of Sardinia, the larvae are intentionally introduced into pecorino cheese to produce the characteristic casu marzu ("rotten cheese" in Sardinian language). When consumed, the larvae can survive in the intestine, causing enteric myiasis.

Description
Mesonotum finely shagreened, not pubescent and with three lines of longitudinal chaetules. "Soies ocellaires écartées l'une de l'autre" [post-vertical orbital bristles present and divergent]. Abdomen is elliptical. Anterior margin of inter ocular space is reddish or orange. Face reddish. Cheeks wide. The wings are faintly iridescent and lie flat upon the fly's abdomen when at rest. 4 mm (0.16 in) long.

References

External links
Image of Piophila casei Los Angeles County Natural History Museum

Flies described in 1758
Piophilidae
Taxa named by Carl Linnaeus